Jida may refer to:

Joint Improvised-Threat Defeat Agency
Jida, Masasi Town, Mtwara Region, Tanzania
, subdistrict of Zhuhai, Guangdong, China
Dzhida, Kyrgyzstan
Ramat Yishai (Jida was the name of the Palestinian village in its place)